Michael Geoffrey Ralphs (born 31 March 1944, Herefordshire) is an English musician, vocalist and songwriter, who was a founding member of rock bands Mott the Hoople and Bad Company.

Career
Ralphs began his career as a teenager, playing with blues-rock band the Buddies. He released a single with that group in 1964 before joining the Mod Doc Thomas Group in 1966. After an eponymous Italian album debut, the band changed its name twice, first to Silence in 1968 and then, in 1969, to Mott the Hoople. Ralphs remained with Mott until 1973.

In 1973, he founded Bad Company along with vocalist Paul Rodgers from Free. The band's debut album in 1974 included the Ralphs'-penned hit "Can't Get Enough", for which Ralphs tuned his guitar in the open-C tuning C-G-C-G-C-E, stating, "It never really sounds right in standard tuning. It needs the open C to have that ring." The debut album reached number one in the United States. Ralphs continued to record and tour with Bad Company until the original band folded in 1982.

In 1984 he toured with Pink Floyd guitarist David Gilmour on Gilmour's About Face tour, although he did not play on the album. In 1985, he released a solo album, Take This, which included Free's and Bad Company's drummer Simon Kirke. He teamed up with future Bad Company guitarist Dave Colwell for a limited four-run live support of the album, which also featured drummer Chris Slade of Manfred Mann's Earth Band and keyboard player Lindsay Bridgewater, who performed with Ozzy Osbourne. He did one performance with a band called Cold Turkey.

Bad Company reformed with different line-ups between 1986 and 1998. But after a reunion tour with the original foursome in 1999, Ralphs announced that he was giving up touring, something he was never comfortable with in either band, since he has an extreme fear of flying.

Ralphs second solo album It's All Good, an instrumental, came out in 2001. Two years later his That's Life – Can't Get Enough album was released, including a demo version of "Can't Get Enough".

In 2004, he once again teamed up with former Mott colleague Ian Hunter, playing second lead guitar (along with Andy York) on Hunter's UK tour. Ralphs performed at Hunter's 2005 concert at the London Astoria, with Ralphs performing a guitar solo to "All the Way from Memphis".

On 2 July 2008, it was announced that the original line-up of Bad Company (minus Boz Burrell who died in September 2006) would do a one-off gig at the Hard Rock Hotel and Casino in Hollywood, Florida on 8 August 2008. According to Rodgers, they did this gig to "protect the legacy they have built and cement the rights to the trademark Bad Company for touring".

Mott the Hoople, including Ralphs, reunited for two shows at the Blake Theatre in Monmouth close to Rockfield Studios where they rehearsed before playing five concerts at the Hammersmith Apollo in London, during September and October 2009. All five of the original members participated in the reunion with Martin Chambers assisting on drums.

In 2011, Ralphs formed The Mick Ralphs Blues Band with musicians he met while guesting at a jam session at the Nag's Head pub in High Wycombe: Stuart Son Maxwell, harmonica/vocals; Jim Maving, guitar; Sam Kelly, drums; Dickey Baldwin, bass. The band's website stated that Ralphs sought to explore his blues and soul roots, playing covers of classic blues and R&B songs. The band made its debut as Mick Ralphs and Co at Jagz Club in Ascot, Berkshire in June 2011, changing the name to the Mick Ralphs Blues Band soon afterwards. More dates were announced for late 2011 and early 2012.

In 2012, Bad Company performed a short run of European festival dates.

In 2013 and 2014, Bad Company and Lynyrd Skynyrd jointly toured throughout the United States and Canada, initially commemorating the 40th anniversary of Skynyrd's first album release and Bad Company's formation.

In 2016, Bad Company announced a US tour with Joe Walsh. Ralphs initially announced that he would not be participating in this tour and that Rich Robinson of the Black Crowes would be standing in for him.  In June 2016, the group announced a UK arena tour with special guests Richie Sambora and Orianthi culminating in a show at London's O2 Arena on 29 October. Ralphs rejoined the band for the duration of the tour.  Following the band's concluding performance in London, it was reported that Ralphs had been hospitalized, having suffered a stroke. He has not returned to the band since with his lead guitar parts being played by second guitarist, Howard Leese and keyboard parts being played by Rogers.

Guitars

Mott the Hoople – Gibson Les Paul Junior, Gibson Firebird (Single Pick-Up), Gibson SG, Fender Telecaster
Bad Company – Fender Telecaster, Fender Stratocaster, Gibson Les Paul Standard, Fender Esquire, Gibson Flying V – "Feel Like Making Love" video
Recently – Gibson 1957/1959 Custom Shop re-issue Gibson Les Paul Standards
Fender Stratocaster fitted with a 2TEK bridge

Notable songwriting credits
"Rock and Roll Queen"
"Ready For Love"
"Can't Get Enough"
"Good Lovin' Gone Bad"
"Movin' On"
"One of the Boys" with Ian Hunter
"Feel Like Makin' Love" with Paul Rodgers
"Flying Hour" with George Harrison
"Oh, Atlanta" (recorded originally by Bad Company on the album Desolation Angels; later covered by Alison Krauss)

Discography

Solo 
 1984 - Take This - Re-edited on CD in 1996
 2001 - It's All Good - Recorded live in 1999 with Simon Kirke and Boz Burrell
 2003 - That's Life

Mott the Hoople 
 1969 - Mott the Hoople
 1970 - Mad Shadows
 1971 - Wildlife
 1971 - Brain Capers
 1972 - All the Young Dudes
 1972 - Rock and Roll Queen
 1973 - Mott
 1974 - The Hoople - Ralphs sang backup vocals on "Pearl 'n' Roy (England)" and played rhythm guitar on "Roll Away the Stone".

Bad Company 
 1974 - Bad Company
 1975 - Straight Shooter
 1976 - Run With The Pack
 1977 - Burnin' Sky
 1979 - Desolation Angels
 1982 - Rough Diamonds
 1985 - 10 from 6 - Compilation
 1986 - Fame and Fortune - Brian Howe replaced Paul Rodgers
 1988 - Dangerous Age
 1990 - Holy Water
 1992 - Here Comes Trouble
 1993 - What You Hear Is What You Get: The Best of Bad Company - Live album with Howe as lead vocalist
 1995 - Company of Strangers - Robert Hart replaced Howe as lead vocalist
 1996 - Stories Told & Untold
 1999 - The 'Original' Bad Co. Anthology
 2006 - Live in Albuquerque 1976
 2010 - Hard Rock Live - Rodgers was back in the lineup
 2011 - Live at Wembley
 2016 - Live in Concert 1977 & 1979

Mick Ralphs Blues Band 
 2013 - I Should Know Better
 2016 - If It Ain't Broke

Collaborations 
 1971 : Under Open Skies by Luther Grosvenor
 1984 : Ralphs toured with David Gilmour to support his second solo album About Face, with Gregg Dechert on keyboards, Mickey Feat on bass, Sue Evans & Jody Linscott on percussions, Raphael Ravenscroft on sax, flute and keyboards and Chris Slade on drums. No live album has been released but a video of a performance at the Hammersmith Odeon was released in 1984 with special guests: Roy Harper (vocals, percussion) and Nick Mason (drums).

See also
List of Gibson players
List of guitarists

References

External links
 Official Page for Mick Ralphs
 Official Page for Mick Ralphs Blues Band
 Official Page for Bad Company
 Official Page for Mott The Hoople

1944 births
Living people
English rock guitarists
English songwriters
Bad Company members
People from Hereford
Lead guitarists
Mott the Hoople members
Glam rock musicians